Maxwell Robert Bradford (born 19 January 1942) is a former New Zealand politician and cabinet minister. He was an MP for the National Party from 1990 to 2002. He is best known for introducing the "Bright Future" economic initiative in 1999, and for changes to the retail sector of the electricity industry in 1998.

Early life
Bradford was born in Christchurch and educated at Christchurch Boys' High School and the University of Canterbury. He is married to Rosemary Bradford and has two stepdaughters.

Before entering politics, he worked at the New Zealand Treasury, the International Monetary Fund, and the New Zealand Employers Federation. He was chief executive of the NZ Bankers Association and the New Zealand National Party before entering the New Zealand Parliament as an MP in 1990.

Member of Parliament

 
Bradford was first elected to Parliament as MP for Tarawera in the 1990 election, replacing National Party colleague Ian McLean. In the 1996 election, there was an electoral redistribution following the introduction of the Mixed Member Proportional (MMP) electoral system in New Zealand. He contested and won the Rotorua electorate. In the 1999 election, he was defeated in Rotorua by Labour's Steve Chadwick, but remained in Parliament as a list MP. In his political career, he served in a number of Cabinet positions, including Minister of Defence, Minister of Energy, Minister of Labour, Minister of Revenue, Minister of Enterprise and Commerce, Minister of Tertiary Education and Minister of Immigration.

After politics
After retiring from Parliament in 2002, Bradford became a director in Castalia Strategic Advisors Ltd, an international consultancy practice specialising in governance, energy and water reform. In 2007, he established his own consultancy Bradford & Associates Ltd specializing in governance advisory and implementation projects He has consulted for organisations such as the World Bank, the Inter-American Development Bank, the Asian Development Bank and foreign governments, and has worked in Guyana, Liberia, Sudan, Bangladesh, Vietnam, Guinea-Bissau, Haiti, Fiji, and Cambodia amongst other countries.

From 2013 to 2014 he led a World Bank project on behalf of Oxford Policy Management to help improve the effectiveness of the Public Accounts Committee and other financial oversight committees of the Bangladesh Parliament.

In 2013, he was voted  New Zealand's best energy minister in recent years.

He retired in 2015.

References

External links

 New Zealand Bankers Association

1942 births
Living people
Members of the Cabinet of New Zealand
New Zealand defence ministers
New Zealand National Party MPs
New Zealand list MPs
Members of the New Zealand House of Representatives
New Zealand MPs for North Island electorates
People educated at Christchurch Boys' High School
University of Canterbury alumni
21st-century New Zealand politicians